The Koenigsegg Gemera is a limited production four-seat plug-in hybrid grand tourer to be manufactured by the Swedish automobile manufacturer Koenigsegg. It was unveiled on 3 March 2020 at an online broadcast by Koenigsegg at the cancelled Geneva Motor Show.

Specifications
 
The Gemera is the first four-seater car built by Koenigsegg and the first to be powered by a compact engine weighing only . The engine is so small because it is a camless piston engine, the first such engine announced for a production car. Called the Tiny Friendly Giant (TFG), it displaces 1988.25cc and has two turbos and three cylinders driving the front wheels and charging the batteries. These outputs are produced when the engine runs on E85 fuel, but it can run on any major fuel from E100 to standard gasoline. The engine also features cylinder deactivation and claims to be 20 percent more fuel efficient than a typical four-cylinder engine of the same displacement.

Being the first all-wheel-drive model, the Gemera has all-wheel steering and torque vectoring. In line with other Koenigsegg models, the chassis has a carbon fibre monocoque with aluminium sub-structures. The car features electronically adjustable ride height and a titanium exhaust system manufactured by Akrapovič.

The main design feature of the Gemera is the lack of a B-pillar and two large dihedral doors which open forward to allow easier access to the leather upholstered four-seater cabin. Creature comforts include four heated and four cooled cup-holders, driver assistance systems, four touchscreens (two 13-inch central touchscreens along with two additional screens for the side and rear view cameras), infotainment system for the front and rear passengers, front and rear wireless phone chargers, Apple CarPlay, Wi-Fi connection, a three-zone climate system, electrically adjustable seats and a premium audio system with 11 speakers. Koenigsegg announced that production will be limited to 300 
cars.

In 2022, Koenigsegg announced plans to expand its operations with the construction of a new state-of-the-art factory in which the Gemera will be built. The new addition will contain a high-tech production & assembly line, a customer lounge, offices, spaces for events, as well as additional warehousing and pre-production spaces. When complete, the Koenigsegg factory will total over 30,000 square metres.

Performance

See also 

 List of production cars by power output

Note

References

External links 
 

Gemera
Plug-in hybrid vehicles
Rear mid-engine, all-wheel-drive vehicles
Cars introduced in 2020
Grand tourers
Coupés